YOP may refer to:
 Rainbow Lake Airport, airport located adjacent to Rainbow Lake, Alberta, Canada
 Youthful Offender Program, a US program for youth offenders under 22 to be moved to lower security prisons for rehabilitation
 Youth Opportunities Programme, a UK government scheme for helping 16- to 18-year-olds into employment
 Yop, a yogurt drink by Yoplait

See also
YOPHD